Bariahi is a village in Saharsa district of Bihar state, India.

Geography

Location
National Highway 107 passes through Bariahi.  Nearest airport is Saharsa  Airport.

References

Villages in Madhepura district